Dragon Hill is a small hillock immediately below the Uffington White Horse on the border of the civil parishes of Uffington and Woolstone in the English county of Oxfordshire. In 1974 it was transferred from Berkshire.

Dragon Hill is a natural chalk hill with an artificially flattened top (on the scarp slope of White Horse Hill); according to legend, Saint George slew the dragon here. A bare patch of chalk upon which no grass will grow is purported to be where the dragon's blood spilled. It has been suggested as some sort of Iron Age ritual site associated with the nearby hill figure.

It is part of the White Horse group of monuments in the care of the National Trust, and a Scheduled Monument in its own right.

Influence and cultural references
The hill was used as the setting for the music video of the Kate Bush song "Cloudbusting".

References

External links
Uffington White Horse and Dragon Hill (Mysterious Britain & Ireland)

Hills of Oxfordshire
History of Berkshire
Iron Age sites in England
National Trust properties in Oxfordshire
Vale of White Horse
Archaeological sites in Oxfordshire